Gapontsev is a Russian surname. Notable people with the surname include:

Valentin Gapontsev (1939-2021), Russian-American billionaire
Vladimir Gapontsev (born 1985), Russian classical guitarist

Russian-language surnames